The Charlotte was a pub and concert venue in Leicester, England, on the edge of the City Centre, on Oxford Street, opposite De Montfort University.

The Charlotte was originally named The Princess Charlotte, later to become simply 'The Charlotte'. The Charlotte was a nationally recognised 'circuit venue' on the live music scene, hosting many famous bands such as Blur, Dale Richardson's Lazy Dollies, Carter USM, Radiohead, Elastica, The Cranberries, Pulp, The Proclaimers, The Stone Roses, Jayne County & The Electric Chairs, The La's, Spiritualized, The Killers, Bloc Party, The Arctic Monkeys, Brian and the Teenagers, Macavity's Cat, Demented are Go, Kingmaker, Oasis, The Libertines, The Offspring, Razorlight, The Buzzcocks, Primal Scream, Muse, Biffy Clyro, Foals and Kasabian. The venue had a number of house  bands, including Armour, Gealic Bread, Mask and The Rise. These house bands often acted as warm-up for the main acts.

On 15 January 2009, it was announced the Charlotte was facing closure, after the operating company behind the venue went into administration. On 10 March 2009 it was announced that the Charlotte would remain closed for the foreseeable future, however it reopened on 8 October 2009.  It was subsequently announced that the last night would be on 13 March 2010 and that the site would be developed into student flats. The Venue closed on 13 March 2010.

On 11 April 2014, The Charlotte re-opened briefly as a pub hosting occasional live music sessions. It closed again just a few months later.

In August 2015, it was announced that The Charlotte was being taken on by two real ale pub landlords from Leicester. The Charlotte opened as an independent real ale pub on 19 October 2015, serving microbrewery real ales from around the country seven days a week.

The Charlotte closed as a pub in February 2017 and the building became a supermarket.

References

External links
 Famous City Venue Faces Closure, Leicester Mercury
 Who Will Save The Charlotte? – article in the Leicester Mercury
'I Owe This Venue A Fair Bit: My Missus, My Kids, My Beer Gut ...', Leicester Mercury
 The Charlotte – Homepage

Buildings and structures in Leicester
Culture in Leicestershire
Music venues in Leicestershire
Pubs in Leicestershire
Former pubs in England
Former music venues in England